Ivan "The Hydro" Hippolyte (born 7 October 1964) is a Surinamese-Dutch former kickboxer World champion. He is currently the chairman and coach at the Vos Gym in Amsterdam, Netherlands. He is a former sparring partner and teammate of four time K-1 World champion Ernesto Hoost as well as veteran mixed martial artist Gilbert Yvel.

He has also been a trainer for K-1 World Champion Remy Bonjasky and Mirko Filipović.

Titles

 1995 K-3 Grand Prix '95 Champion  
 1995 W.M.T.C. Middleweight World Champion at Lumpinee Stadium, Bangkok, Thailand
 1994 K-3 Dutch Edition Tournament Champion -76.2 kg
 M.T.B.N. World Champion
 W.M.T.A. World Champion -72 kg
 1988 W.K.A. Welterweight World Champion
 4 times E.M.T.A. European Muay Thai Champion 
 1986 European Champion Savate

Fight record

|-
|-  bgcolor="#CCFFCC"
| 2000-10-22 || Win ||align=left| Rayen Simson || It's Showtime - Exclusive || Haarlem, Netherlands || TKO (Leg Injury) || 4 || 1:00
|-
|-  bgcolor="#CCFFCC"
| 2000-06-04 || Win ||align=left| Hassan Ettaki || Night of Revenge || Haarlem, Netherlands || Decision || 5 || 3:00
|-
|-  bgcolor="#FFBBBB"
| 1999-09-05 || Loss ||align=left| Perry Ubeda || Battle of Arnhem I || Arnhem, Netherlands || TKO (Shin Injury) || 1 || 
|-
|-  bgcolor="#FFBBBB"
| 1999-10-24 || Loss ||align=left| Rayen Simson || It's Showtime - It's Showtime || Haarlem, Netherlands || Decision || 5 || 3:00
|-
|-  bgcolor="#CCFFCC"
| 1998-05-31 || Win ||align=left| Perry Ubeda || Fight of the Decade || Amsterdam, Netherlands || Decision || 5 || 3:00
|-
|-  bgcolor="#FFBBBB"
| 1996-11-16 || Loss ||align=left| Hassan Ettaki || Night of Dynamite || Amsterdam, Netherlands || TKO (Cut on Shin) || 1 ||
|-
|-  bgcolor="#FFBBBB"
| 1996-09-01 || Loss ||align=left| Jason Suttie || K-1 Revenge '96 || Osaka, Japan || Decision (Unanimous) || 5 || 3:00
|-
|-  bgcolor="#FFBBBB"
| 1996 || Loss ||align=left| Sakmongkol Sithchuchok || || Pattaya, Thailand || Decision (Unanimous) || 5 || 3:00
|-
|-
! style=background:white colspan=9 |
|-
|-  bgcolor="#CCFFCC"
| 1995-07-16 || Win ||align=left| Taiei Kin || K-3 Grand Prix '95, Final || Nagoya, Japan || Ext.R Decision (Majority) || 4 || 3:00
|-
! style=background:white colspan=9 |
|-
|-  bgcolor="#CCFFCC"
| 1995-07-16 || Win ||align=left| Toshiyuki Atokawa || K-3 Grand Prix '95, Semi Finals || Nagoya, Japan || 2nd Ext.R Decision (Unanimous) || 5 || 3:00
|-
|-  bgcolor="#CCFFCC"
| 1995-07-16 || Win ||align=left| Changpuek Kiatsongrit || K-3 Grand Prix '95, Quarter Finals || Nagoya, Japan || KO (Punch) || 2 || 0:20
|-
|-  bgcolor="#FFBBBB"
| 1995-04-02 || Loss ||align=left| Orlando Wiet || || Amsterdam, Netherlands || Decision || 5 || 3:00 
|-
|-  bgcolor="#CCFFCC"
| 1995 || Win ||align=left| Pompetch Naratreekul || Lumpinee Stadium || Bangkok, Thailand || KO || ||
|-
! style=background:white colspan=9 |
|-
|-  bgcolor="#CCFFCC"
| 1994-09-15 || Win ||align=left| Faizel Reding || K-3 Dutch Edition Tournament, Final || Amsterdam, Netherlands || Decision || 5 || 3:00
|-
! style=background:white colspan=9 |
|-
|-  bgcolor="#CCFFCC"
| 1994-04-30 || Win ||align=left| Hiromu Yoshitaka || K-1 Grand Prix '94, Super Fight || Tokyo, Japan || Decision (Unanimous) || 5 || 3:00
|-
|-  bgcolor="#CCFFCC"
| 1992-10-25 || Win ||align=left| Vichan Chorrotchai || Holland vs Thailand: The Revenge || Amsterdam, Netherlands || Decision || 5 || 3:00
|-
|-  style="background:#fbb;" 
| 1992-03-01 || Loss ||align=left| Jomhod Kiatadisak || Holland vs Thailand 7 ||  Netherlands|| Decision|| 5 ||3:00

|-  bgcolor="#CCFFCC"
| 1991-10-20 || Win ||align=left| Brian Pieters || Hot Night in Amsterdam || Amsterdam, Netherlands || Decision (Unanimous) || 5 || 3:00
|-
|-  bgcolor="#CCFFCC"
| 1991-04-21 || Win ||align=left| Orlando Wiet || Kickboxing "Holland vs Canada" || Amsterdam, Netherlands || Decision || 5 || 3:00 
|-
|-  bgcolor="#FFBBBB"
| 1991-04-21 || Loss ||align=left| Mungkordet Kiatprasarnchai || Holland vs Thailand VI || Amsterdam, Netherlands || Decision || 5 || 3:00 
|-
|-  bgcolor="#c5d2ea"
| 1991 || Draw ||align=left| Krongsak Sakcharoenchai || || Amsterdam, Netherlands || Decision || 5 || 3:00
|-
|-  bgcolor="#FFBBBB"
| 1990-12-10 || Loss ||align=left| Mungkordet Kiatprasarnchai ||  || Bangkok, Thailand || KO (Knee) || ||  
|-
|-  bgcolor="#CCFFCC"
| 1990-10-14 || Win ||align=left| Mungkordet Kiatprasarnchai || Holland vs Thailand V || Amsterdam, Netherlands || Decision || 5 || 3:00  
|-
! style=background:white colspan=9 |
|-
|-  bgcolor="#CCFFCC"
| 1990-04-01 || Win ||align=left| Tony Moore || Holland vs England || Amsterdam, Netherlands || TKO (Gave Up) || 4 ||   
|-
|-  bgcolor="#CCFFCC"
| 1990 || Win ||align=left| Jomhod Kiatadisak || || Phoenix, Arizona, USA || TKO (Punches) || 3 ||  
|-
|-  bgcolor="#CCFFCC"
| 1989-10-08 || Win ||align=left| Guillaume Kerner || || Amsterdam, Netherlands || Decision || 3 || 3:00 
|-
|-  bgcolor="#FFBBBB"
| 1989-04- || Loss ||align=left| Krongsak Sakcharoenchai ||  || Paris, France || Decision || 5 || 3:00  
|-
|-  bgcolor="#CCFFCC"
| 1988-11-20 || Win ||align=left| Orlando Wiet || || Netherlands || Decision || 5 || 3:00 
|-
|-  bgcolor="#CCFFCC"
| 1988-06-11 || Win ||align=left| Neth Saknarong|| Champions in Action || Amsterdam, Netherlands || TKO (Punches) || 2 || 
|-
|-  bgcolor="#CCFFCC"
| 1988 || Win ||align=left| David Humphries || || || || ||
|-
! style=background:white colspan=9 |
|-
|-  bgcolor="#CCFFCC"
| 1987 || Win ||align=left| Humphrey Harrison || Champions of Champions || U.K. || Decision (Unanimous) || 5 || 3:00 
|-
! style=background:white colspan=9 |
|-
|-  bgcolor="#CCFFCC"
| 1985-05-26 || Win ||align=left| Habib Ben-Salah || || Netherlands || TKO (Referee Stoppage, Knee) || ||  
|-
|-
| colspan=9 | Legend:

References

External links
 k-1sport.de Profile
 Sherdog Profile

See also
List of K-1 events
List of male kickboxers

1964 births
Living people
Dutch male kickboxers
Dutch savateurs
Surinamese male kickboxers
Surinamese savateurs
Welterweight kickboxers
Middleweight kickboxers
Kickboxing trainers
Mixed martial arts trainers
Surinamese emigrants to the Netherlands
Sportspeople from Amsterdam